WRWR (107.5 MHz) is an FM radio station broadcasting an urban adult contemporary format. The station is currently owned by Christopher Murray, through licensee Praise 107.5 FM Radio LLC, and operates from studios in Macon, Georgia.

WRWR's transmitter is located a few miles southeast of Warner Robins with an effective radiated power of 4,000 watts, because of the location, and lower power, WRWR only has a moderate signal in downtown Macon, and a moderate to weak signal in the northern suburbs of Macon. In an attempt to cover these areas better, WRWR has an FM translator at 105.1 in Macon.

History
The station signed on in January 2010, owned by Georgia Eagle Media, under the moniker "The Warner Robins Patriot". Local high school sports including football, basketball, and baseball are featured on this station. It is also affiliated with the co-owned internet newspaper, Warner Robins Patriot, which is the hometown Internet news source for Warner Robins and Houston County, Georgia. It was later sold to Christopher Murray and its studio was relocated to Macon where it shares studios with WFXM-FM.

References

External links
Kiss 105.1 & 107.5 Facebook

RWR
Urban adult contemporary radio stations in the United States